Crystal Peak is a high mountain summit in the Tenmile Range of the Rocky Mountains of North America.

Approach routes
Most climbers approach Crystal Peak from the east, in particular via the Crystal Lakes basin. This approach, a pleasant hike, follows jeep trails until treeline and Lower Crystal Lake.  Four-wheel-drive vehicles can generally make it this far. A trail on the lake's north side takes climbers to Upper Crystal Lake, where gentle scree slopes provide access to the ridges north of the summit.

See also

List of Colorado mountain ranges
List of Colorado mountain summits
List of Colorado fourteeners
List of Colorado 4000 meter prominent summits
List of the most prominent summits of Colorado
List of Colorado county high points

References

External links

Mountains of Colorado
Mountains of Summit County, Colorado
Arapaho National Forest
North American 4000 m summits